The Aramco Team Series is a professional women's golf competition that is part of the Ladies European Tour (LET), first played in 2020.

The inaugural tournament was played as the Saudi Ladies Team International at Royal Greens Golf & Country Club in King Abdullah Economic City (KAEC) by the Red Sea in Saudi Arabia. It was the penultimate LET event of the 2020 season and followed the Aramco Saudi Ladies International.

2021 saw the competition expanded to become the Aramco Team Series, with four tournaments to be held in the United Kingdom, the United States, Spain and Saudi Arabia, each with a US$1 million prize fund.

Format
The tournament is a team competition with a total of 26 teams (36 in 2020 and 2021), each team consisting of three professionals and one amateur.

A draft is used to form the teams for the tournament. The team captains are seeded based on the official Women's World Golf Rankings. In a random order, the captains select the first additional player to join their team. Each team is then randomly assigned an amateur player and another professional from the remaining field. 

Scoring is on a "two-from-four" basis which sees the best two scores on each hole counted for the team competition. With this format, the amateurs may contribute to the result of the game. In addition, the professionals complete every hole and the score is used for the individual competition.

For 2022, the format was amended so that teams compete over only 36 holes, the first two days of the tournament, with the final day exclusively for the 60 and ties who make the cut, to compete for the individual title. Also, instead of an 80/20 split, an equal split of the  prize between the team and individual events was introduced.

Winners

Individual

Team

(c) – Captain, (a) – Amateur

See also
Aramco Saudi Ladies International

References

External links

Ladies European Tour

Aramco Saudi Ladies International
Golf tournaments in Saudi Arabia
Golf tournaments in England
Golf tournaments in Spain
Golf in New York (state)
Golf tournaments in Thailand